The 1990 NAIA women's basketball tournament was the tenth annual tournament held by the NAIA to determine the national champion of women's college basketball among its members in the United States and Canada.

Southwestern Oklahoma State defeated Arkansas–Monticello in the championship game, 82–75, to claim the Bulldogs' fifth NAIA national title and first since 1987.

The tournament was played at the Oman Arena in Jackson, Tennessee.

Qualification

The tournament field remained fixed at sixteen teams, with seeds assigned to the top eight teams.

The tournament utilized a simple single-elimination format.

Bracket

See also
1990 NCAA Division I women's basketball tournament
1990 NCAA Division II women's basketball tournament
1990 NCAA Division III women's basketball tournament
1990 NAIA men's basketball tournament

References

NAIA
NAIA Women's Basketball Championships
1990 in sports in Tennessee